The 2013 NBA Summer League is a pro basketball league run by the NBA just after the 2013 NBA draft. It gives newly drafted players a chance to test their skills against each other, and to give them a feel for professional basketball. All 30 NBA teams participated, along with the D-League Select. The Miami Heat were the only team to participate in both Summer Leagues. It ran from July 7–12 in Orlando and July 12–22 in Las Vegas. Jeremy Lamb of the Oklahoma City Thunder was named the Most Valuable Player of the Orlando Summer League. Jonas Valančiūnas of the Toronto Raptors went on to be named the Most Valuable Player of the Las Vegas Summer League. Ian Clark of the Golden State Warriors was named the Most Valuable Player of the Las Vegas Summer League Championship Game.

Orlando Pro Summer League

Teams
Orlando Magic (host)
Brooklyn Nets
Boston Celtics
Detroit Pistons
Houston Rockets
Indiana Pacers
Miami Heat
Oklahoma City Thunder
Philadelphia 76ers
Utah Jazz

Schedule
All times are in Eastern Daylight Time (UTC−4)

Day 1

Day 2

Day 3

Day 4

Day 5

Championship Day

Seeding
The seeding is determined by a team's total points after the first five days. Seven points are awarded in each game: three points for winning a game and one point for every quarter a team won. In the event of a tied quarter, each team are awarder half a point. If two or more teams have equal points, then the following tiebreakers apply:
Total point differential
Total points allowed
Coin flip
Each team is paired with the team that is the closest seed to them, for example: the top two seeds will play in the championship game, the third and fourth seeds will play in the third-place game, etc.

9th-place game

7th-place game

5th-place game

3rd-place game

Championship game

Final standings

Statistics leaders

Points

Rebounds

Assists

Honors
The All-Summer League Team is an honor bestowed on the best players in the summer league as voted on by participating Public Relations Directors and members of Orlando Magic official website.

All-Summer League First Team:
Andre Drummond, Detroit Pistons
Terrence Jones, Houston Rockets
Jeremy Lamb, Oklahoma City Thunder (MVP)
Victor Oladipo, Orlando Magic
Kelly Olynyk, Boston Celtics 

All-Summer League Second Team:
Ian Clark, Miami Heat
Solomon Hill, Indiana Pacers
Reggie Jackson, Oklahoma City Thunder
Miles Plumlee, Indiana Pacers
Tyshawn Taylor, Brooklyn Nets

All-Summer League Honorable Mention:

Dwight Buycks, Oklahoma City Thunder
Kentavious Caldwell-Pope, Detroit Pistons
Michael Carter-Williams, Philadelphia 76ers
James Ennis, Miami Heat
Maurice Harkless, Orlando Magic

Grant Jerrett, Oklahoma City Thunder
Orlando Johnson, Indiana Pacers
Tony Mitchell, Detroit Pistons
Kyle O'Quinn, Orlando Magic
Mason Plumlee, Brooklyn Nets

Phil Pressey, Boston Celtics
Chris Roberts, Utah Jazz
Peyton Siva, Detroit Pistons

Las Vegas NBA Summer League

Teams
Atlanta Hawks
Charlotte Bobcats
Chicago Bulls
Cleveland Cavaliers
Dallas Mavericks
Denver Nuggets
Golden State Warriors
Los Angeles Clippers
Los Angeles Lakers
Memphis Grizzlies
Miami Heat
Milwaukee Bucks
Minnesota Timberwolves
NBA D-League Select
New Orleans Pelicans
New York Knicks
Phoenix Suns
Portland Trail Blazers
Sacramento Kings
San Antonio Spurs
Toronto Raptors
Washington Wizards

Standings/Seedings after Day 5

Schedule

Day 1

Day 2

Day 3

Day 4

Day 5

Championship
The championship will be determined by a single elimination tournament, the top 10 teams receive a bye.

Seeding
Teams are seeded first by overall record, then by a tiebreaker system.
Quarter Scoring totals (1 point for win, .5 for tie, 0 for loss)
Head to Head
Point Differential
Coin Flip
First-round losers play consolation games to determine 17th through 22nd places. These teams either keep their own seeding or inherit that of their first-round opponent, if lower. Based on this, teams are matched against their closest-seeded opponent with #17 playing #18, #19 playing #20, and #21 playing #22.

Second-round losers play consolation games to determine ninth through 16th places. These teams take the lower seed number of the two teams involved in their second-round games with the built-in assumption that lower-seeded teams that won their first-round games inherited the higher seed from the opponent they defeated. Based on this, teams are matched against their closest-seeded opponent with #9 playing #10, #11 playing #12, #13 playing #14, and #15 playing #16.

Bracket

First round

Second round

Consolation round

Quarterfinals

Semifinals

Finals

Final standings

Individual statistical leaders
Reference: 

Points

Rebounds

Assists

Honors
Being named to the All-Summer League Team is an honor bestowed upon the best players in the Las Vegas summer league as voted on by members of the media in attendance.

All-Summer League Team:
Jonas Valančiūnas, Toronto Raptors (MVP)
Jeffery Taylor, Charlotte Bobcats
Kent Bazemore, Golden State Warriors
John Henson, Milwaukee Bucks
Cody Zeller, Charlotte Bobcats
Championship Game MVP: Ian Clark, Golden State Warriors

References

Las Vegas Bracket

External links
Official Site

2013
2013–14 NBA season
2013–14 in American basketball by league
2013 in sports in Florida
2013 in sports in Nevada